The Choleswarar temples were constructed by the Chola kings.  Several of these temples are included in a UNESCO World Heritage Site, the Great Living Chola Temples.

Other Shiva temples built by Chola:
 Sundaresvara temple at Tirukattalai (Aditya I)
 Komganatha temple at Srinivasanallur (Parantaka I)
 Airavateswara temple at Darasuram (Rajaraja Chola II)
 Kamaparharesvara temple at Tirubuvanam (Kulothunga Chola III)
 Choleeswaram temple at Kantalai (Raja Raja Chola I)

Similar to Solesvara, there are number of temples in praise of the Pandiya kings and they are called Pandisvara.

References

Hindu temples in Tamil Nadu
Shiva temples
Tamil history
Solesvara temples
Chola architecture